KOTE is a radio station in Eureka, Kansas, playing country music, SRN news, and local weather.

References

External links
 

OTE